Zhangixalus puerensis is a species of frog in the family Rhacophoridae.
It is endemic to China, where it is only known from Banshan (半山), Pu'er City, Yunnan.
Its natural habitats are subtropical or tropical moist montane forests, subtropical or tropical high-altitude grassland, freshwater marshes, and intermittent freshwater marshes.
It is threatened by habitat loss.

References

puerensis
Amphibians of China
Endemic fauna of Yunnan
Taxonomy articles created by Polbot
Amphibians described in 1999